Back-story, in the production of consumer goods, is information about the effects of their production.

 sustainability advocates had begun evoking literary backstories to refer to the "backstories" of goods: that is, the impacts on the planet and people, caused by producing and delivering those goods. Without knowledge of the full backstory of a product, a consumer cannot accurately judge whether the impacts of purchasing it are good or bad. Some environmentalists and  consumer-protection advocates argue that greater corporate and governmental transparency would  be a critical step towards sustainability, enabling consumers to make more informed choices, and activists to bring public opinion to bear on practices they consider unethical.

See also 

 Supply Chain

References 

Activism
Ecology
Production and manufacturing